Philip "Snapdragon" Stern (September 3, 1919 – December 13, 2014) was an American photographer noted for his iconic portraits of Hollywood stars, as well as his war photography while serving as a U.S. Army Ranger with "Darby's Rangers" during the North African and Italian campaigns in World War II.

Settling in Los Angeles after the war, Stern was staff photographer for LOOK magazine. He also worked for Life magazine and Collier's. He was present on numerous film productions as still photographer, and in that capacity took photographs of a huge cross-section of the film community. Stern's images of Marilyn Monroe, James Dean, Marlon Brando and even musician Louis Armstrong have become widely recognized icons.

A lifelong smoker, Stern died at the age of 95 in Los Angeles from COPD and congestive heart failure which he had been battling for over three and a half decades.

References

External links
 Official site

1919 births
2014 deaths
Artists from Philadelphia
Movie stills photographers
War photographers
United States Army personnel of World War II
United States Army Rangers
Deaths from emphysema